{{Infobox cricket team 
| name                   = India
| image                  =
| image_size             = 220px
| caption                = Official Crest of the BCCI
| nickname               = Women in Blue
| association            = Board of Control for Cricket in India
| captain                = Harmanpreet Kaur
| coach                  = Hrishikesh Kanitkar (acting)| test_status_year       = 1976
| icc_status             = Full member
| icc_member_year        = 1926
| icc_region             = Asia
| wodi_rank              = 
| wt20i_rank             = 
| wodi_rank_best         =  (1 May 2020) 
| wt20i_rank_best        =  (15 Nov 2019) 
| first_wtest            = v  at the M. Chinnaswamy Stadium, Bangalore; 31 October – 2 November 1976
| most_recent_wtest      = v  at Carrara Stadium, Gold Coast; 30 September – 3 October 2021
| num_wtests             = 38
| num_wtests_this_year   = 0
| wtest_record           = 5/6(27 draws)
| wtest_record_this_year = 0/0 (0 draws)

| first_wodi             = v  at Eden Gardens, Calcutta; 1 January 1978
| most_recent_wodi       = v  at Lord's, London; 24 September 2022
| num_wodis              = 301
| num_wodis_this_year    = 0
| wodi_record            = 164/132(1 ties, 4 no result)
| wodi_record_this_year  = 0/0(0 ties, 0 no results)
| wwc_apps               = 10
| wwc_first              = 1978
| wwc_best               =  Runners-up (2005, 2017)
| wwcq_apps              = 1
| wwcq_first             = 2017
| wwcq_best              =  Champions (2017)

| first_wt20i            = v  at the County Cricket Ground, Derby; 5 August 2006
| most_recent_wt20i      = v  at Newlands Cricket Ground, Cape Town; 23 February 2023
| num_wt20is             = 167
| num_wt20is_this_year   = 10
| wt20i_record           = 89/74(1 tie, 4 no results)
| wt20i_record_this_year = 6/3(0 ties, 1 no results)
| wwt20_apps             = 8
| wwt20_first            = 2009
| wwt20_best             =  Runner-up (2020)

| h_pattern_la           = 
| h_pattern_b            = _collar
| h_pattern_ra           = 
| h_pattern_pants        = 
| h_leftarm              = FFFFFF
| h_body                 = FFFFFF
| h_rightarm             = FFFFFF
| h_pants                = FFFFFF
| h_title                = WTest kit
| a_pattern_la           = 
| a_pattern_b            = _india21
| a_pattern_ra           = 
| a_pattern_pants        = 
| a_leftarm              = 001C57
| a_body                 = 001C57
| a_rightarm             = 001C57
| a_pants                = 001C57
| a_title                = WODI kit
| t_pattern_la          = 
| t_pattern_b           = _blueshoulders
| t_pattern_ra          = 
| t_pattern_pants       = 
| t_leftarm             = 0000CD
| t_body                = 0070FF
| t_rightarm            = 0000CD
| t_pants               = 0070FF
| asofdate              = 23 February 2023
}}
The India women's national cricket team, also known as Team India or Women in Blue, represents India in women's international cricket. It is governed by Board of Control for Cricket in India.

India made its Test debut in 1976, against the West Indies, and its One Day International (ODI) debut at the 1978 World Cup, which it hosted. India made its T20I debut in 2006, against England.

The team has made the ODI World Cup final on two occasions, losing to Australia by 98 runs in 2005 and losing to England by 9 runs in 2017. India has made the semi-finals on three other occasions, in 1997, 2000, and 2009. India has also made the finals of the T20I World Cup on one occasion (2020) and the semi-finals on four occasions (2009, 2010, 2018 and 2023).

India won a Silver medal in 2022 Commonwealth Games. India has won all the editions of Women's Asia Cup, except the 2018 edition. 
India is the most successful women's cricket team in Asia.

History

The British brought cricket to India in the early 1700s, with the first documented instance of cricket being played is in 1721. It was played and adopted by Kolis of Gujarat because they were sea pirates and outlaws who always loot the British ships so East India Company tried to manage the Kolis in cricket and been successful. The first Indian cricket club was established by the Parsi community in Bombay, in 1848; the club played their first match against the Europeans in 1877. The first official Indian cricket team was formed in 1911 and toured England, where they played English county teams. The India team made their Test debut against England in 1932. Around the same time (1934), the first women's Test was played between England and Australia. However, women's cricket arrived in India much later; the Women's Cricket Association of India was formed in 1973. The Indian women's team played their first Test match in 1976, against the West Indies. India recorded its first-ever Test win in November 1978 against West Indies under Shantha Rangaswamy's captaincy at the Moin-ul-Haq Stadium in Patna. 

In 1973 Women's Cricket Association of India, the governing body for women's cricket was founded in Pune, Maharashtra. Premala Chavan was its first president. It was affiliated to International Women's Cricket Council. As part of the International Cricket Council's initiative to develop women's cricket, the Women's Cricket Association of India was merged with the Board of Control for Cricket in India in 2006/07.

In 2021, the BCCI announced that Ramesh Powar would become the Head Coach of the Indian Women's Cricket Team. In 2022, Indian Women script history by winning 1st series on England soil in 23 years.

Governing body

The Board of Control for Cricket in India (BCCI) is the governing body for the Indian cricket team and first-class cricket in India. The Board has been operating since 1929 and represents India at the International Cricket Council. It is amongst the richest sporting organisations in the world. It sold media rights for India's matches from 2006 to 2010 for US$612,000,000. It manages the Indian team's sponsorships, its future tours and team selection. The International Cricket Council (ICC) determines India's upcoming matches through its future tours program.

Selection Committee

On 26 September 2020, the Board of Control for Cricket in India (BCCI) announced the appointment of All-India Women's Selection Committee.
Neetu David, former left-arm spinner, heads the five-member selection committee.
Neetu David
Arati Vaidya
Renu Margrate
Venkatacher Kalpana
Mithu Mukherjee

Team colours

 Sponsorship 

The current sponsor of the team is BYJU's. OPPO's sponsorship was to run from 2017 until 2022, but was handed over to BYJU's on 5 September 2019. Previously, the Indian team was sponsored by Star India from 2014 to 2017, Sahara India Pariwar from 2002 to 2013.

Nike had been a long time kit supplier to team India having acquired the contract in 2005, with two extensions for a period of five years each time; in 2011 and 2016 respectively. Nike ended its contract in September 2020 and MPL Sports Apparel & Accessories, a subsidiary of online gaming platform Mobile Premier League replaced Nike as the kit manufacturer in October 2020.

On 30 August 2019, following the conclusion of the Expression of Interest process for Official Partners’ Rights, the Board of Control for Cricket in India (BCCI) announced that Sporta Technologies Pvt. Ltd. (Dream11), LafargeHolcim (ACC Cement and Ambuja Cement) and Hyundai Motor India Ltd. have acquired the Official Partners' Rights for the BCCI International and Domestic matches during 2019-23.

Paytm acquired the title sponsorship for all matches played by the team within India in 2015 and extended the same in 2019 until 2023. Star India and Airtel have been title sponsors previously.

International grounds

Captains

 Forthcoming fixtures 
The recent results and forthcoming fixtures of India in international cricket:

Players
Former players

 Squad 

This lists all the active players who are centrally contracted with BCCI or was named in the recent Test, ODI or T20I squads. Updated on 27 March 2022

Key

Players' salaries are as follows:

Match fees
The BCCI adopted a pay equity policy in match fees for men's and women's teams on 27 October 2022.

Personnel

 Head Coach – Vacant
 Batting Coach – Hrishikesh Kanitkar Fielding Coach – Abhay Sharma Nets Trainers – Tanveer Shukla, Sourav Tyagi, Utkarsh Singh, Akhil S Prasad
 Physiotherapist –Mitra Amin Fitness Trainer –Radha Krishnaswamy Analyst –Devraj RautTournament history
ICC Women's Cricket World Cup

ICC Women's Cricket World Cup Qualifier

ICC Women's Championship

ICC Women's Twenty20 World Cup

ACC Women's Asia Cup

 Honours 
ICCWomen's World Cup: Runners-up (2): 2005, 2017Women's T20 World Cup: Runners-up (1): 2020

ACCWomen's Asia Cup: Champions (7): 2004, 2005–06, 2006, 2008, 2012, 2016, 2022
 Runners-up (1): 2018

OthersCommonwealth Games Silver medal (1): 2022

Individual records

Statistics

Test cricketTest record versus other nationsMost Test runs for IndiaMost Test wickets for IndiaHighest team total: 467 v England, 14 August 2002 at County Ground, Taunton, England
Highest individual score: 214, Mithali Raj v England, 14 August 2002 at County Ground, Taunton, England
Best innings bowling: 8/53, Neetu David v England, 24 November 1995 at Jamshedpur, India
Best match bowling: 10/78, Jhulan Goswami v England, 29 August 2006 at County Ground, Taunton, England

One-Day InternationalsMost ODI runs for IndiaMost ODI wickets for IndiaPlayers in bold text are still active with India.

Highest team total: 358/3 v Ireland, 15 May 2017 at Senwes Park, South Africa
Highest individual score: 188, Deepti Sharma v Ireland, 15 May 2017 at Senwes Park, South Africa
Best innings bowling: 6/10, Mamatha Maben v Sri Lanka, 25 April 2004 at Asgiriya Stadium, Sri Lanka

Twenty20 InternationalsMost T20I runs for IndiaMost T20I wickets for India'''

See also

India men's national cricket team
India national under-19 cricket team
List of India women Test cricketers
List of India women ODI cricketers
List of India women Twenty20 International cricketers  
Women in India, overview of situation of ladies in India 
Shweta Sherawat a promising U19 Cricketer of India 
Shafali Verma an exciting young talent of Indian Women’s Cricket Team

References

Notes

Bibliography

 

 

 
Women's national cricket teams
Women
 
Cricket
1976 establishments in India